Dale Murray is a Canadian singer-songwriter and musician. He is a guitarist and vocalist for the indie rock band Cuff the Duke, and releases solo material under his own name.

Biography
Murray resides in Dartmouth, Nova Scotia, and is the nephew of Anne Murray.

In the late 1990s, along with Ruth Minnikin and Matt Mays, Murray formed The Guthries. They released two albums, Off Windmill in 2000, and the self-titled The Guthries in 2002. The band toured extensively throughout Canada and the UK. Following the release of their second album, the band members each began pursuing solo projects, and have not released another Guthries album.

Murray released his first solo album, Brighter Lives, Darker Side, in 2005.

In 2005, Murray, Nathan Lawr, Ryan Bishops, Ruth Minnikin and Kate Maki participated in two national concert tours, A Midautumn Night's Dream and A Midwinter Night's Dream, which were reportedly inspired by Bob Dylan's Rolling Thunder Revue. The five musicians also recorded limited edition albums for sale on each tour.

In late 2005, Murray became a member of Cuff the Duke. In 2008, Murray toured extensively with Cuff the Duke acting as Hayden's backing band.

Discography
Murray has played on many records as session musician or guest artist. The following records are those on which he is credited as a fully contributing band member or composer.

 Yarn (1996) – Booming Airplanes
 Put Paul First (2000) – Paul Bellini
 Off Windmill (2000) – The Guthries
 The Guthries (2002) – The Guthries
 La Nouvelle Gauche (2002) – The Hylozoists
 Matt Mays (2002) – Matt Mays
 Talkin' Honky Blues (2003) – Buck 65
 EP (2003) –  Ruth Minnikin
 Marooned and Blue (2004) – Ruth Minnikin
 The Sun Will Find Us (2004) – Kate Maki
 Brighter Lives, Darker Side (2005) – Dale Murray
 Secret House Against the World (2005) – Buck 65
 The Life and Hard Times of Guy Terrifico (soundtrack) (2005)
 Matt Mays & El Torpedo (2005) – Matt Mays & El Torpedo
 Cuff the Duke (2005) – Cuff the Duke
 Secret Carpentry (2005) – Nathan Lawr
 La Fin du Monde (2006) – The Hylozoists
 When the Angels Make Contact (2006) – Matt Mays
 Sidelines of the City (2007) – Cuff the Duke
 Little Jabs (2007) – Two Hours Traffic
 Orchestra for the Moon (2007) – Jenn Grant
 On High (2008) – Kate Maki
 In Field & Town (2008) – Hayden
 Terminal Romance (2008) – Matt Mays & El Torpedo
 The Heavy Blinkers – The Heavy Blinkers
 Better Weather – The Heavy Blinkers
 The Night and I Are Still So Young – The Heavy Blinkers
 Hopeful Monster – Hopeful Monster
 Can't Sleep This One Off – Adam Puddington
 For the Meantime – Adam Puddington
 Back in Town – Adam Puddington
 Nothing Is Where It Was – Norma MacDonald
 Country Soul – The Hurtin' Unit
 Bottom of a Heart – Sherry Ryan
 Lost Balloons – Caledonia
 Wandering Midnight – Gabe Minnikin
 Things Have Changed – David Myles
 Nothing Stays the Same – Jason Haywood
 Songs of Brendan Flynn – Brendan Flynn
 Emergence – Dave Carmichael
 Miss Canada – Little Miss Moffat
 You Ain't Getting My Country – The Divorcees
 Two Hearts – Christina Martin

External links
Cuff the Duke

Year of birth missing (living people)
Musicians from Halifax, Nova Scotia
Living people
Canadian rock singers
Canadian rock guitarists
Canadian male guitarists
Canadian singer-songwriters
Canadian indie rock musicians
Canadian country rock musicians
People from Dartmouth, Nova Scotia
Canadian male singer-songwriters